Remo Mancini ICD.D (born May 26, 1951) is a former senior corporate executive in both the U.S and Canada, former politician in Ontario, Canada,  and currently a “professional corporate director” serving on both private company and publicly listed corporate Boards.

He was an elected member of the Legislative Assembly of Ontario representing the constituency of Essex South  from 1975 to 1993. He also served as a cabinet minister in both economic and social portfolios (including Minister of Revenue) in the government of David Peterson.

Background
Mancini was born in the small remote mountain village of Abbateggio, Province of Pescara, Italy. The first documents about the village's existence date back to the 10th century.

A high school “all Ontario” gold medal gymnast, he received athletic scholarships to both U.S and Canadian Universities. Injuries ended Mancini's athletic career and formal education.

Mancini is a graduate of the Corporate Governance College at the Rotman School of Management, University of Toronto. and received his internationally recognized ICD.D certification. The program is a joint initiative by Rotman and the Institute of Corporate Directors.

Politics
In 1972 at 21 years of age Mancini was elected to the local municipal council of Anderdon township. In December 1974, Mancini was elected Deputy  reeve of Anderdon Township and Essex County councillor at the age of 23.(the youngest person ever elected to the Essex County Council).

Mancini was elected to the provincial legislature as M.P.P. the following year in the Ontario general election of 1975, defeating Progressive Conservative Frank Klees by just over 2,000 votes in Essex South.  He defeated Klees again by a wider margin in the 1977 Ontario election, and easily retained his seat in the elections of 1981, 1985 and 1987.

The Liberal Party was able to form a minority government under David Peterson following the 1985 provincial election, after 42 years in opposition. Mancini was named as the Premier's parliamentary assistant from 1985 to 1987.  He was promoted to Minister without portfolio responsible for disabled persons on September 29, 1987, and finally to Minister of Revenue on August 2, 1989.

The Liberal government was defeated by the New Democratic Party in the 1990 Ontario election.  Mancini  retained his seat and was the only Liberal MPP elected in the entire Windsor, Sarnia, London region.

Remo Mancini was elected House Leader by the Liberal Caucus in a formal process and served until February 1992. While in opposition Mancini was Chairman of the Public Accounts Committee. Mancini retired from the legislature on April 30, 1993.

Parliamentary positions

Corporate Life
In February 1994, Mancini joined the Canadian Transit Company ( as director of corporate affairs) which operates the Canadian portion of the Ambassador Bridge linking Windsor, Ontario and Detroit, Michigan. Four months later, he was promoted to vice-president. When Mancini retired in 2004 he was Executive Vice President  of both the Detroit International Bridge Company and the Canadian Transit Company . The Ambassador Bridge is privately owned, managed and operated and is the world's busiest international commercial border crossing.

In 2006 he was appointed to the Board of Advisors of Watts Energy, a Michigan-based energy company focused on renewable wind energy.

In 2007, Mancini was elected Chairman of the Board of the Windsor-Essex Development Commission (WEDC), a not-for-profit corporation that seeks to "maximize economic diversity, growth and prosperity" in Windsor and Essex. In March 2008, Mancini was appointed Acting Interim Executive Officer, making Mancini the WEDC's fifth CEO in five years. Mancini resigned, along with the entire WEDC Board of Directors in March 2009 due to political interference after publicly stating such interference was contrary the principles under which the Dev. Com. was established.

References

External links 

1951 births
Businesspeople from Ontario
Italian emigrants to Canada
Living people
Members of the Executive Council of Ontario
Ontario Liberal Party MPPs
People from Essex County, Ontario
University of Toronto alumni